Brown sound may refer to:

 Brown noise or Brownian noise, a random signal
 Brown note, a hypothetical sound wave that would cause involuntary defecation
 Dave Baksh (born 1980), a guitarist known as "Brownsound"
 The Brown Noise, the final episode of the third season of South Park 
 Brown sound, a guitar sound style of Eddie Van Halen